Ali Ibrahim Jama (: born. 26 June 1956), also known as Ali Baghdadi, is a Somali central banker who has been Governor of the Bank of Somaliland since 5 July 2018.

References

1956 births
Living people
Ethnic Somali people
Governors of Central Bank of Somalia
University of Baghdad alumni
Alumni of the University of London
Togdheer